The Epic of Gilgamesh is an epic poem from ancient Mesopotamia.

Epic of Gilgamesh may also refer to:
The Epic of Gilgamesh (Martinů), 1955 oratorio by Bohuslav Martinů 
The Epic of Gilgamesh, or This Unnameable Little Broom, 1985 stop motion short film
The Epic of Gilgamesh, a 2005 album by Abed Azrie

See also
Gilgamesh (disambiguation)
List of characters in Epic of Gilgamesh
Gilgamesh and Aga, an earlier version of the epic
Gilgamesh: A New English Version, a 2004 translation of the epic by Stephen Mitchell